Arantxa Sánchez Vicario and Nathalie Tauziat were the defending champions, but Tauziat did not compete in this edition. Sánchez Vicario teamed up with Daniela Hantuchová and lost in first round to Elena Dementieva and Janette Husárová.

Lisa Raymond and Rennae Stubbs won the title, defeating Virginia Ruano Pascual and Paola Suárez 7–6(7–4), 6–7(4–7), 6–3 in the final. It was the 32nd title for Raymond and the 36th title for Stubbs in their respective careers. It was also the 6th title for the pair during this season, including other 2 Tier I wins in Tokyo and Indian Wells.

Seeds

Draw

Finals

Top half

Bottom half

Qualifying

Qualifying seeds

Qualifiers
  Rika Hiraki /  Nana Miyagi

Qualifying draw

References
 Official results archive (ITF)
 Official results archive (WTA)

2002 NASDAQ-100 Open
NASDAQ-100